Thomas Bradley was born in 1596 or 1597, the son of Henry Bradley of Wokingham in Berkshire and his wife, Barbara daughter of Walter Lane of Reading in the same county. He was educated at Exeter College, Oxford and was admitted to the degree of Doctor of Divinity.  On 5 March 1631, he married Frances the youngest daughter of John, Baron Savile of Pontefract.

He was initially chaplain to George Villiers, 1st Duke of Buckingham, whom he accompanied on trips to the Île de Ré and to La Rochelle and in 1628 he was appointed chaplain to Charles I.  He became Rector of Castleford in 1630 and from 1643 he was additionally Rector of Ackworth.  His parishes were in a strongly Royalist part of Yorkshire.  During the Siege of Pontefract in 1644, he was a preacher to the Royalist troops under Sir George Wentworth.  In 1645 Parliamentarian troops occupied Ackworth and he was deprived of his livings. He underwent much suffering during the Interregnum when along with his family he was ejected from their home.  It is generally supposed that he attended  Charles I at his execution on 30 January 1649.

He was restored to the rectory of Ackworth following the end of the Commonwealth of England in 1660.  In 1666 he founded two almshouses at Ackworth. He resigned from his livings in 1672 and died on 10 October 1673.

Notes

References

'Prebendaries: North Newbald', Fasti Ecclesiae Anglicanae 1541–1857, vol. 4: York diocese (1975), pp. 48–9
Joseph Foster, Alumni Oxonienses: the members of the University of Oxford, 1500–1714: their parentage, birthplace, and year of birth, with a record of their degrees: Being the matriculation register of the University (4 vols, Oxford; London: Parker, 1891–92), vol. 1

Publications
Comfort from the cradle, as well as from the crosse of Christ, 2 sermons (Oxford, 1650)
A præsent for Cæsar, of 100000 l. in hand and 50000 l. a year (London, 1658)
A sermon ad clerum (York, 1663)
Nosce te ipsum, in a comparison between the first, and second Adam (York, 1668)
Elijah's nunc dimittis. Or the authors own funerall sermons (York, 1669)
Elijah's epitaph, and the motto of all mortalls (York, 1670)

1590s births
1673 deaths
Alumni of Exeter College, Oxford
Anglican writers
17th-century English Anglican priests
English theologians
People from Wokingham
Clergy from Yorkshire
Cavaliers